These are the official results of the Women's High Jump event at the 1987 IAAF World Championships in Rome, Italy. There were a total number of 24 participating athletes, with two qualifying groups and the final held on Sunday August 30, 1987.

Summary
Stefka Kostadinova came into the competition as the world record holder at 2.08m and favorite, but it was not going to be uncontested.  Soviet Tamara Bykova was the defending champion and the woman Kostadinova replaced as world record holder, her Bulgarian teammate, Lyudmila Andonova was also a finalist, though she was untested following a 2-year doping suspension.

By 2.02m the rest of the competition had topped out, the last being Susanne Beyer clearing 1.99m, Bykova and Kostadinova still having a clean round.  Jumping first, Bykova continued clean at 2.04m, but Kostadinova took three tries to stay alive in the competition, putting Bykova in the driver's seat.  After Bykova missed a second time at 2.06m, Kostadinova cleared, taking the lead.  Bykova passed to take a heroic attempt to equal the world record, 3 cm over her personal best, her only chance for the win.  Bykova missed and the medals were settled.

On her second attempt, she went over. Kostadinova's world record has stood since.

Medalists

Schedule
All times are Central European Time (UTC+1)

Abbreviations
All results shown are in metres

Records

Results

Qualifying round
Held on Saturday 1987-08-29

Final

See also
 National champions high jump (women)
 1984 Women's Olympic High Jump (Los Angeles)
 1984 Women's Friendship Games High Jump (Prague)
 1986 Women's European Championships High Jump (Stuttgart)
 1988 Women's Olympic High Jump (Seoul)
 1990 Women's European Championships High Jump (Split)
 1991 Women's World Championships High Jump (Tokyo)

References

 Results

H
High jump at the World Athletics Championships
1987 in women's athletics